Meotachys is a genus of ground beetles in the family Carabidae. There are about 11 described species in Meotachys.

Species
These 11 species belong to the genus Meotachys:
 Meotachys amplicollis (Bates, 1882)  (Central America and Mexico)
 Meotachys ballorum Boyd & Erwin, 2016  (South America)
 Meotachys fraterculus (Bates, 1871)  (South America)
 Meotachys insularum (Bates, 1884)  (Central America)
 Meotachys jansoni (Bates, 1882)  (Central America)
 Meotachys platyderus (Bates, 1871)  (South America)
 Meotachys riparius Boyd & Erwin, 2016  (South America)
 Meotachys rubrum Boyd & Erwin, 2016  (South America)
 Meotachys rufulus (Motschulsky, 1855)  (Central America)
 Meotachys squiresi (Bates, 1871)  (South America)
 Meotachys sulcipennis (Bates, 1871)  (South America)

References

Trechinae